The Brother from Another Planet is a 1984 American science fiction film, written and directed by John Sayles. The low-budget film stars Joe Morton as an extraterrestrial trapped on Earth.

Plot
A mute space alien crash-lands his ship on Ellis Island. Other than his three-toed feet which he keeps covered, he resembles a black human man. He manages to blend in with the people he encounters and engages in one-sided conversations with various denizens of New York City. He secures housing through a new acquaintance at a Harlem bar. Able to heal wounds and fix machines by holding his hand over them, he repairs an arcade cabinet there, leading to him gaining a job as a technician. Two men in black, keen on the mute alien's whereabouts, begin to track him and interrogate the people he has encountered. They seek to return him to the planet from which he escaped.

Cast

 Joe Morton as The Brother
 Rosanna Carter as West Indian Woman
 Ray Ramirez as Hispanic Man
 Yves Rene as Haitian Man
 Peter Richardson as Islamic Man
 Ginny Yang as Korean Shopkeeper
 Daryl Edwards as Fly
 Steve James as Odell
 Leonard Jackson as Smokey
 Ishmael Houston-Jones as Dancer
 Caroline Aaron as Randy Sue Carter
 Bill Cobbs as Walter
 Maggie Renzi as Noreen
 Olga Merediz as Noreen's Client
 Tom Wright as Sam
 Minnie Gentry as Mrs. Brown
 Ren Woods as Bernice
 Reggie Rock Bythewood as Rickey
 John Sayles and David Strathairn as Men In Black
 Fisher Stevens as Card Trickster
 Dee Dee Bridgewater as Malverne Davis
 Giancarlo Esposito as Man Being Arrested (uncredited)

Production

Director John Sayles has described The Brother from Another Planet as being about the immigrant experience of assimilation. Extras from the film described it as "The Black E.T. movie."

Sayles spent part of his MacArthur Fellows "genius" grant on the film, which cost $350,000 to produce.

Critical reception
Variety called The Brother from Another Planet a "vastly amusing but progressively erratic" film structured as a "series of behavioral vignettes, [many of which] are genuinely delightful and inventive"; as it continues, the film "takes a rather unpleasant and, ultimately, confusing turn." Vincent Canby called it a "nice, unsurprising shaggy-dog story that goes on far too long" but singled out "Joe Morton's sweet, wise, unaggressive performance."  Roger Ebert gave the film three-and-a-half stars out of four, saying "the movie finds countless opportunities for humorous scenes, most of them with a quiet little bite, a way of causing us to look at our society", noting that "by using a central character who cannot talk, [Sayles] is sometimes able to explore the kinds of scenes that haven't been possible since the death of silent film."

The A.V. Club, in a 2003 review of the film's DVD release, said the film's superhero scenes are "often unintentionally silly, but again, Sayles shapes a catchy premise into a subtler piece, using Morton's 'alien' status as a way of asking who deserves to be called an outsider in a country born of outsiders"; commenting on the DVD, they noted its "marvelous" audio commentary track by Sayles, "who moves fluidly from behind-the-scenes anecdotes to useful technical tips to unpretentious dissections of his own themes."

Paul Attanasio wrote: "Sayles is no storyteller; despite the verve of its language, The Brother From Another Planet eventually sags of its own weight. And all his movies are hampered by an almost shocking ignorance of filmmaking fundamentals -- he just doesn't know where to put his camera. The movie would have benefited from more attention to the bounty hunters, whose difficulties with Harlem culture would have balanced the Brother's strange ease of assimilation. Instead, the plot takes a centrifugal turn as the Brother roots out a scag baron whose drugs are poisoning the community."

See also
Afrofuturism in film

References

External links
 
 
 
 
 The Brother from Another Planet film preview at YouTube

1984 films
1980s science fiction comedy films
1984 independent films
1980s superhero films
Afrofuturist films
American science fiction comedy films
American independent films
American superhero films
Films directed by John Sayles
Films set in New York City
Films shot in New Jersey
Films shot in New York City
Films set in Harlem
Film superheroes
Films with screenplays by John Sayles
Films scored by Mason Daring
1984 comedy films
1980s English-language films
1980s American films